Countisbury is a hamlet on Exmoor in Devon, England. It is roughly two miles east of Lynmouth along the A39. It has a church and pub. The National Trust owns the other buildings.

Since 2012, Countisbury has formed part of the civil parish of Brendon and Countisbury, having previously been a civil parish in its own right.

Scholars  now believe the Iron Age promontory fort of Wind Hill on Countisbury Hill was the site of the Battle of Cynuit in 878.

References 

Hamlets in Devon